Clubb Creek is a stream in Bollinger County in the U.S. state of Missouri. It is a tributary of Hawker Creek.

Clubb Creek has the name Abe Clubb, a pioneer settler.

See also
List of rivers of Missouri

References

Rivers of Bollinger County, Missouri
Rivers of Missouri